The genus Muilla includes four to five species of flowering plants.

Taxonomy
The genus name is a taxonomic anagram of Allium (in fact, the letters are in exact reverse order), the onion genus, for the flowers' resemblance.

In the APG III classification system, it is placed in the family Asparagaceae, subfamily Brodiaeoideae. The subfamily has also been treated as a separate family Themidaceae.

Distribution
Muilla species are native to southwestern North America.

Species
Current species   
{| class="wikitable"
|-
! Image !! Scientific name !! Common Name!! Distribution
|-
| ||Muilla coronata  Greene || crowned muilla || Mojave Desert region in southeastern California and southern Nevada.
|-
| || Muilla lordsburgana P.J. Alexander || Lordsburg noino || eastern fringe of the Chihuahuan Desert around Lordsburg Mesa in New Mexico.<ref>[https://www.biorxiv.org/content/biorxiv/early/2021/04/16/2020.09.24.312215.full.pdf biorxiv: Muilla lordsburgana (Lordsburg noino)]</ref>
|-
| || Muilla maritima  (Torr.) S.Watson ex Benth. in G.Bentham & J.D.Hooker || sea muilla || central and southern California; northern Baja California.
|-
| ||Muilla transmontana Greene ||  Great Basin muilla || Mojave Desert and Great Basin regions in southeastern and northeastern California and western Nevada.
|-
|}

Formerly included speciesMuilla clevelandii (S.Watson) Hoover — synonym of Bloomeria clevelandii'' S.Watson

References

External links
 Calflora Database: Muilla species
 Jepson Manual eFlora (TJM2) treatment of Muilla
 USDA Plants Profile for Muilla
 Flora of North America: Muilla

Asparagaceae genera
Brodiaeoideae
Flora of Baja California
Flora of California
Flora of Nevada